

League standings
 The first Four Teams Qualify to Qatar Cup.

References 

Volleyball in Qatar
2013 in volleyball
2013 in Qatari sport
2014 in volleyball
2014 in Qatari sport